Viktor Hald Thorup  (born 14 August 1994) is a Danish speed skater who competes internationally.
 
He participated at the 2018 Winter Olympics finished in 5th place in the Mass Start which was raced for the first time at the Olympic games in PyeongChang. Viktor Hald Thorup currently holds Danish national records in the men's 1500m, 3000m, 5000m and 10000m.

Personal records

References

External links 
 

1994 births
Living people
Danish male speed skaters
Olympic speed skaters of Denmark
Speed skaters at the 2018 Winter Olympics
Speed skaters at the 2022 Winter Olympics
People from Slagelse
Sportspeople from Region Zealand